Best of the Web can refer to:

 "The Best of the Web Today" written by James Freeman
 The "Best of the Web" awards by BusinessWeek
 The "Best of the Web" by Forbes magazine
 The "Best of the Web Directory" by Best of the Web Directory
 Best of the Web awards at the Museums and the Web conference
 Informally, it sometimes is used to refer to the Webby Awards